Sergio Daniel "Checho" Batista (born 9 November 1962) is an Argentine football manager and former international player.

As a footballer he played as a midfield for Argentinos Juniors, River Plate, Nueva Chicago, Tosu Futures and All Boys. He represented his national team 39 times from 1985 to 1990 where the team won the 1986 FIFA World Cup. After retiring he moved into coaching with Bella Vista before returning to his former club Argentinos Juniors, as well as spells at Talleres, Nueva Chicago and Godoy Cruz. With the Argentine Olympic team, he won the gold medal in the 2008 Olympics, which led to him being head coach of the Argentina national football team from July 2010 to July 2011.

Playing career

Club

Batista played youth football in Argentinos Juniors, and debuted with the first team in 1981. With Argentinos, he won the 1984 Metropolitano and 1985 Nacional of the Argentine Primera División, as well as the 1985 Copa Libertadores.

In 1988, Batista moved to River Plate; they won the 1989–90 league title. In 1992, he moved to Nueva Chicago. In 1993, he moved to PJM Futures in Japan. He retired as a player in 1994 and for two years from 1995 served as an assistant coach of 2 Japanese clubs. In 1997, he returned to play for All Boys in Argentina.

International

After his impressive displays for Argentinos Juniors in the 1985 Copa Libertadores, the Argentine coach Carlos Bilardo called Batista up for a friendly against Mexico on 14 November 1985 in a game that ended in a 1–1 draw. With the 1986 FIFA World Cup soon looming, Batista quickly went on to establish himself as a first choice player within the Argentina national football team. Despite his limited international experience, he played each tournament game, Argentina won. An established regular within the squad, Batista played in the 1987 Copa América, 1989 Copa América and 1990 FIFA World Cup, which Argentina came runner-up in.

Managerial career

Batista started his managerial career with Uruguayan club Bella Vista in 2000. He then had two spells with Argentinos Juniors, one with Talleres de Córdoba and one with Nueva Chicago. Between 2005 and 2006, he was assistant to Oscar Ruggeri in San Lorenzo.

In October 2007, the former midfielder was appointed as the head coach of the Argentine U-20 national team, replacing Hugo Tocalli. He managed the gold medalist Argentina Olympic football team at the 2008 Summer Olympics.

After the 2010 World Cup, Argentina national team manager Diego Maradona did not renew his contract, and Batista was appointed as caretaker manager on 27 July 2010.
In his role, Batista led Argentina to two wins (1–0 over Ireland and 4–1 over World Cup holders Spain) and suffered a defeat against Japan 0–1. Three months later, he was named the official head coach of the Argentina national team. In his first match after being officialized as Argentina's coach, his team defeated Brazil 1–0, with a 90th-minute goal by Lionel Messi.
On 25 July 2011, the AFA announced that Batista had stepped down as manager of the Argentina national team after poor results in the Copa América.

Honours

As a player
Argentinos Juniors
Argentine Primera División: 1984 Metropolitano, 1985 Nacional
Copa Libertadores: 1985

River Plate
Argentine Primera División: 1989–90
Argentina
FIFA World Cup: 1986

As a manager

Argentina
Summer Olympics Tournament gold medal: 2008

Notes

References

External links

1962 births
Living people
Footballers from Buenos Aires
Argentine footballers
Association football midfielders
Argentinos Juniors footballers
Club Atlético River Plate footballers
Nueva Chicago footballers
Sagan Tosu players
All Boys footballers
Argentine Primera División players
Primera Nacional players
Japan Football League (1992–1998) players
Argentina international footballers
1986 FIFA World Cup players
1987 Copa América players
1989 Copa América players
1990 FIFA World Cup players
Copa Libertadores-winning players
FIFA World Cup-winning players
Argentine expatriate footballers
Argentine expatriate sportspeople in Japan
Expatriate footballers in Japan
Argentine football managers
C.A. Bella Vista managers
Argentinos Juniors managers
Talleres de Córdoba managers
Nueva Chicago managers
Godoy Cruz Antonio Tomba managers
Argentina national under-20 football team managers
Argentina national football team managers
Shanghai Shenhua F.C. managers
Bahrain national football team managers
Qatar SC managers
Uruguayan Primera División managers
Argentine Primera División managers
Primera B Nacional managers
Chinese Super League managers
Qatar Stars League managers
Medalists at the 2008 Summer Olympics
Olympic gold medalists for Argentina
2011 Copa América managers
Argentine expatriate football managers
Argentine expatriate sportspeople in Uruguay
Argentine expatriate sportspeople in China
Argentine expatriate sportspeople in Bahrain
Argentine expatriate sportspeople in Qatar
Expatriate football managers in Uruguay
Expatriate football managers in China
Expatriate football managers in Bahrain
Expatriate football managers in Qatar
Argentine Internet celebrities